Edward W. McBroom (born May 30, 1981) is a Republican member of the Michigan Senate, representing the 38th district since 2019. The district is twelve of Michigan's fifteen Upper Peninsula counties: Alger, Baraga, Delta, Dickinson, Gogebic, Houghton, Iron, Keweenaw, Marquette, Menominee, Ontonagon, and Schoolcraft. He is a former member of the Michigan House of Representatives, first elected in 2010 and re-elected to a second term in 2012 and a third term in 2014. His House district consisted of Dickinson, Delta, and Menominee counties.

McBroom was elected to the Senate on November 6, 2018, succeeding term-limited incumbent Tom Casperson.

References

Living people
1981 births
Republican Party members of the Michigan House of Representatives
Republican Party Michigan state senators
People from Dickinson County, Michigan
Northern Michigan University alumni
21st-century American politicians